Lalbhai Dalpatbhai (1863-1912) was an industrialist and one of the first generation textile mill owners from Ahmedabad, who laid the foundation of the present-day Lalbhai group  of Industries.

Life
Lalbhai was born in 1863 at Ahmedabad to Dalpatbhai Bhagubhai in a Gujarati Jain family of nagarsheths and jewellers and was a direct descendant of the 16th-century merchant, Shantidas Jhaveri.

After growing up, he carried on the traditional business of precious gems of his family. His father Dalpatbhai Bhagubhai was also in cotton trading business since the 1870s As an expansion of his cotton trading business, he decided to start his own cotton mill and in 1896 he floated the Saraspur Mills flowed by Raipur Mills in 1897. These two mills laid the foundation of present-day Lalbhai group. The group was later expanded by his sons and noted nationalist and philanthropist, Kasturbhai Lalbhai, Narottambhai Lalbhai, Chimanbhai Lalbhai and grandsons like Shrenik Kasturbhai Lalbhai, Arvind Narottambhai Lalbhai and Chinubhai Chimanbhai. The group now consists of mills like Arvind Mills, Atul Limited among others.

He died in 1912.

Memorials
Lalbhai Dalpatbhai College of Engineering
Lalbhai Dalpatbhai Museum
Lalbhai Dalpatbhai Arts College
Lalbhai Dalpatbhai Institute of Indology

References

1863 births
1912 deaths
Indian businesspeople in textiles
Businesspeople from Ahmedabad
Gujarati people
Textile industry in Gujarat
Lalbhai family